House of Miracles (Live) is the first live album by American contemporary worship musician Brandon Lake. Bethel Music released the album on January 22, 2021. The album contains guest appearances by Dante Bowe, Matt Maher, Silverberg, Leeland, and Sarah Reeves. The album was produced by David Leonard, Brad King, and Seth Talley.

The album debuted at number twenty-nine on the US Top Christian Albums chart. House of Miracles (Live) received a nomination for the GMA Dove Award Long Form Video of the Year at the 2021 GMA Dove Awards.

Background
On January 22, 2021, House of Miracles (Live) was released as a live companion piece to the original studio project, House of Miracles, which was released in August 2020. It contains the live renditions of songs previously released on the studio album, as well as new songs "Show Me Your Glory", "When the Glory's in the Room" and "Living Sacrifices".

Release and promotion
"House of Miracles" was released on January 8, 2021, as the first promotional single from the album, concurrently launching the album's digital pre-order.

Reception

Critical response

In a positive review for Worship Leader, Randy Cross said of the album: "This powerhouse of worship launches with the declarative title track as an anthem for the church to proclaim to a pandemic-weary world, that there is hope, love and miracles in the gathering of believers." Jonathan Andre in his 365 Days of Inspiring Media review described House of Miracles (Live) as "mixed bag for sure" while comparing it with the studio album which he said was "more cohesive, impacting and comforting."

Accolades

Chart performance
In the United States, House of Miracles (Live) debuted at number 29 on the Billboard Top Christian Albums chart dated February 6, 2021.

Track listing

 Songwriting credits adapted from PraiseCharts.

Charts

Release history

References

External links
 

2021 albums
Brandon Lake albums